The 1967 World Table Tennis Championships women's singles was the 29th edition of the women's singles championship.
Sachiko Morisawa defeated Naoko Fukatsu in the final by three sets to one, to win the title.

Results

See also
 List of World Table Tennis Championships medalists

References

-
1967 in women's table tennis